This article lists the all-time win/loss NCAA Division I FBS sanctioned bowl game records for all NCAA college football teams.

Win–loss records are current as of the 2022–23 bowl season. The columns for "last bowl season" and "last bowl game" have been updated to reflect 2022–23 bowl appearances for all games played through January 9, 2023.

Records

Current FBS programs

Former FBS programs

Notes

Program changes 
 Program has since joined FCS.

See also
 List of NCAA Division I FBS football programs
 List of NCAA Division I FCS playoff appearances by team
 List of NCAA Division II Football Championship appearances by team
 List of NCAA Division III Football Championship appearances by team

References

Lists of college football team records

Bowl